Zhang Yong (born 21 July 1995) is a Chinese former professional snooker player.

Career
Prior to turning professional Zhang featured in Asian Players Tour Championship events from 2012 to 2015, as well as being a semi-finalist in the 2015 ACBS Asian Snooker Championship. He made losing wildcard appearances at the 2014 Shanghai Masters and 2015 China Open.

Zhang earned a two-year professional World Snooker Tour card for the 2015–16 and 2016–17 seasons after his performances in the 2014/2015 Asian Tour events, with the highlight being a quarter-final appearance in the 2015 Xuzhou Open where he beat professionals Jimmy Robertson and Dechawat Poomjaeng, seeing him finish 25th on the Order of Merit.

Zhang won three matches in the early part of the 2015/2016 season, but then lost seven in a row until he beat Joe Swail 10–7 in the first round of World Championship qualifying, before losing 10–3 to Matthew Stevens. He qualified for the 2016 Indian Open, World Open and Riga Masters but was knocked out in the first round of all of them. Later in the 2016–17 season he qualified for the German Masters by beating Mike Dunn 5–4 and Mark Davis 5–3 and he was beaten 5–3 by Stuart Bingham in the opening round.
After losing in the opening round of the 2017 World Championship qualifiers to compatriot Tian Pengfei, Zhang lost his place on the tour at the end of the season due to being ranked outside of the top 64 in the world rankings. He then entered Q School to try to regain his tour card and, after winning eight matches over the two events, he emerged as the highest placed qualifier via the Q School Order of Merit list, thus earning a new two-year professional tour card for the 2017/18 and 2018/19 seasons.

Performance and rankings timeline

Notes

References

External links

Zhang Yong at CueTracker.net: Snooker Results and Statistic Database
Zhang Yong at worldsnooker.com

1995 births
Living people
Chinese snooker players
Sportspeople from Hunan
21st-century Chinese people